The red-capped myzomela (Myzomela lafargei), also known as the scarlet-naped myzomela, is a species of bird in the family Meliphagidae.  It is found in the Solomon Islands archipelago (Buka, Bougainville, the Shortland Islands, Fauro, Choiseul and Santa Isabel).  Its natural habitats are subtropical or tropical moist lowland forests, subtropical or tropical mangrove forests, and subtropical or tropical moist montane forests.

References

red-capped myzomela
Birds of Bougainville Island
Endemic birds of the Solomon Islands
red-capped myzomela
Taxonomy articles created by Polbot